This is a list of released and upcoming video games that are developed in Turkey. The list is sorted by game title, platform, year of release and their developer. This list does not include serious games.

References

External Links
 Hall of Light database (For 17 Amiga games made in Turkey)

 
Turkey
Video games developed